Josh Mosqueira-Asheim is a game designer of both tabletop games and video games, and was game director during the creation of Diablo III at Blizzard Entertainment.

Early life
Josh Mosqueira, of Canadian-Mexican descent, played tabletop games Dungeons & Dragons and Warhammer 40,000 while growing up in Canada. While attending university, he also  served in the Canadian Armed Forces as a member of the Black Watch Regiment.

Tabletop games
In 1996, while still serving in the military and finishing university, Mosqueira became a writer for White Wolf Publishing, co-authoring two books for the Vampire: The Masquerade horror role-playing game, Constantinople by Night and Montreal by Night. He also co-authored the Tribe 8 (1998) swords-and-sorcery post-apocalyptic fantasy role-playing game for Dream Pod 9.

His first full-time job was with Relic Entertainment in Vancouver, where he worked on a variety of video games including Company of Heroes, Warhammer 40,000: Dawn of War,  and Far Cry. He was the Lead Designer for Homeworld 2 in 2003.  For his work on Company of Heroes: Opposing Fronts in 2008, he earned an Elan Award for outstanding innovation in gaming.    

After seven years with Relic, Mosqueira moved to Montreal in 2008 to work on Far Cry 3 for Ubisoft.

In February 2011, Mosqueira was called by a friend, Jay Wilson, who had worked with him on Company of Heroes while they were both at Relic and was now working at Blizzard Entertainment in Irvine, California, where he was the game director of Diablo III. He had called Mosqueira because one of Mosqueira's Ubisoft colleagues had applied for a position as lead designer of the console version of Diablo III. After a few minutes of conversation, Wilson instead offered the position to Mosqueira. Montreal winters were too cold for Mosqueira's liking, so he accepted the position and moved to California. Two years later, Jay Wilson left Blizzard, and Mosqueira replaced him as Lead Designer of Diablo III.

In 2016, Mosqueira left Blizzard. In 2017, he became part of the start-up team for Bonfire Studios located in Orange County, California.

References

External links

https://archive.org/details/GDC2015Mosqueira
Interview at PGGamesN
Article on VentureBeat

American game designers
Blizzard Entertainment people
Diablo (series)
Living people
Place of birth missing (living people)
Sierra Entertainment employees
Year of birth missing (living people)